Equisetum laevigatum is a species of horsetail in the family Equisetaceae. It is known by the common names smooth horsetail and smooth scouring rush. This plant is native to much of North America except for northern Canada and southern Mexico. It is usually found in moist areas in sandy and gravelly substrates. It may be annual or perennial. It grows narrow green stems sometimes reaching heights exceeding 1.5 meters. The leaves at the nodes are small, scale-like brownish sheaths and there are occasionally small, spindly branches. The stems are topped with rounded cone-shaped sporangia.

References

External links

Jepson Manual Treatment
Photo gallery

laevigatum
Flora of North America
Taxa named by Alexander Braun